"Drive" is a song by English electronic group Client, released as the third single from their third studio album, Heartland. It reached number ninety in Germany. The song was used in a club scene in the beginning of the 2008 film The Ramen Girl, along with "Lights Go Out".

Track listings
German CD single (OUT 255, SPV CD 320563)
iTunes EP
"Drive" (Radio Edit) – 3:17
"I'm Lost, I'm Lonely" – 3:21
"Drive" (Lexy & K-Paul Rmx) – 6:36
"Drive" (Dobro Lovemix by Boosta) – 4:00
"Drive" (Thomas Gold Mix) – 8:23

German CD single [2] (OUT 256, SPV CD 320560)
iTunes EP [2]
"Drive" (Radio Edit) – 3:17
"6 in the Morning" (Nik Leman's 3am Def-Disco Mix) – 3:32
"Drive" (Venus Mix by Boosta) – 5:47
"Drive" (Eyerer & Namito Rmx) – 7:35
"Drive" (Housemeister 'B-B-B-Backstreet Mix') – 5:16

German 12" single (HIT 007)
A1. "Drive" (Lexy & K-Paul Rmx)
A2. "Drive" (Michael Hooker Mix)
B1. "Drive" (Thomas Gold Dub)
B2. "Drive" (Venus Mix by Boosta)

German 12" single [2] (HIT 008)
A1. "Drive" (Eyerer & Namito Rmx) – 7:35
A2. "Drive" (Housemeister 'B-B-B-Backstreet Mix') – 5:16
B1. "Drive" (Warboy Remix)
B2. "Drive" (Fuchs Und Horn Rmx)

UK limited edition 12" single (LFSX06)
A1. "Drive" (Thomas Gold Mix) – 8:20
A2. "Drive" (Album Version) – 3:57
B1. "Drive" (Eyerer & Namito Rmx) – 7:31
B2. "6 in the Morning" (Nik Leman's 3am Def-Disco Mix) – 3:29

Scandinavian iTunes single
"Drive" (Single Version) – 3:15
"I'm Lost, I'm Lonely" – 3:21
"Drive" (Boosta Venus Mix) – 5:47
"Drive" (Eyerer and Namito Remix) – 7:33
"Drive" (Thomas Gold Remix) – 8:24
"Drive" (Warboy Remix) – 6:18
"6 in the Morning" (Nick Leman's 3AM Def-Disco Mix) – 3:28

Charts

References

2007 singles
2007 songs
Client (band) songs
Songs about cars
Songs written by Youth (musician)